The Battle of Mołotków (Polish: Bitwa pod Mołotkowem) took place on October 29, 1914, near the village of Mołotków (Molotkiv), Austrian Galicia (current Ukraine). 2nd and 3rd Infantry Regiments of Polish Legions clashed with units of the Russian Imperial Army, which had invaded Galicia (see Russian occupation of Eastern Galicia, 1914–15). Polish forces were part of Tactical Group of General Karol Durski-Trzaska.

On October 29, the Group of Durski-Trzaska attacked Russian positions in the outskirts of Mołotków. Polish 4th Battalion commanded by Bolesław Roja managed to reach the center of the village, but was then stopped and forced to retreat. Meanwhile, the bulk of both 2nd and 3rd Regiments, with some 6000 soldiers, fiercely resisted 12 battalions of Russian infantry (15 000) soldiers, supported by 24 machine guns and 16 cannons. The Russians broke through Polish positions, forcing both regiments to retreat, in order to avoid encirclement.

Polish losses amounted to 200 dead, 300 wounded and 400 captured by the enemy. The Russians lost 100 dead.

The Battle of Mołotków was commemorated in the interwar period on Tomb of the Unknown Soldier, Warsaw, with inscription “MOŁOTKÓW 29 X 1914”. The inscription was removed by Communist authorities, and returned after 1990.

Sources 
 Mieczysław Wrzosek, Polski czyn zbrojny podczas pierwszej wojny światowej 1914-1918, Państwowe Wydawnictwo "Wiedza Powszechna", Warszawa 1990

External links 

 Battle of Mołotków on polskieradio.pl

Mołotkow
Mołotkow
Mołotkow
Conflicts in 1914
1914 in Austria-Hungary
1914 in Ukraine
1914 in Poland
1914 in the Russian Empire